Sedes is Latin for seat.

Sedes may also refer to:
a bishop's episcopal throne, also known as a cathedra
SEDES, one of the oldest civic associations and think tanks of Portugal
Sedes (band), a Polish punk rock band
an administrative unit in the Kingdom of Hungary, also known as Seat (territorial-administrative unit)
Sedes Air Base, a Greek military air base